Saudi Arabia competed at the 2019 Military World Games in Wuhan from 18 to 27 October 2019. It sent a delegation consisting of 41 athletes competing in five sports for the event.

Participants 

Source

Medal summary

Medal by sports

Medalists

References 

Nations at the 2019 Military World Games
2019 in Saudi Arabian sport